Peer Gynt Sculpture Park (Peer Gynt-parken) is a sculpture park located in Oslo, Norway. The sculpture park was created in honour of the Norwegian writer, Henrik Ibsen as a monumental presentation of one of his plays Peer Gynt, act by act.

The park was established in 2006 by Selvaag, the company behind the housing development in the Løren-area and most of the sculptures are the result of an international sculpture competition. Selvaag was founded by Olav Selvaag and is a family-owned company that has placed sculptures in residential areas for more than 50 years, with over 500 sculptures in total.

The competition 
The sculptures placed in Peer Gynt Sculpture Park comes from an open, international competition of the designs for the best figurative sculptures depicting scenes from Henrik Ibsen's drama Peer Gynt. The host of the competition is Selvaag, the parent company of several subsidiaries. The members of the jury are: Director Ellen Horn from the Norwegian Riksteatret, sculptor Kirsten Kokkin, Prof. Vigdis Ystad from Senter for Ibsenstudier (The Centre for Ibsen Studies), Kim Brandstrup from Galleri Brandstrup, Peder Lund from Lund Fine Art, Artist Kristian Blystad, and Ole Gunnar Selvaag, one of Selvaags owners and the founder behind the Peer Gynt Sculpture park.

The sculptures 
The Peer Gynt Sculpture Park is unique because famous sculptors from many countries have each interpreted a piece of a play. So far 20 sculptures have been placed in the park:
Peer Gynt, Man of the World by Nina Sundbye, Norway
The Wild Buck Ride by Andrea Bucci, Italy
The Devil in the Nut by Enzo Cucchi, Italy
The Abduction by  Jim Dine, USA
Peer and three girls by Sergey Eylanbekov, USA/Russia
Trolls with Pig Heads by Christine Aspelund, Norway
Peers kamp mot Bøygen by Fredrik Raddum, Norway
Solvejg at the newly-built hut by Wolf Bröll, Germany
Peer by Aase's deathbed by Kinga Smaczna-Lagowska, Poland
Peer and the Monkeys by Petter Hepsø, Norway
Peer at the Emperor's Horse, wearing the Emperor's clothes by Piotr Grzegorek, Poland
Anitras dance by Leopoldo Emperador, Spain
Peer and Anitra in the Desert by Elena Engelsen and Per Ung, Norway
Where the starting point is crazy minimal, the outcome is highly original by Anna Passakas and Radoslaw Kudlinski, Poland
Peer Meets Begriffenfeldt at the Mental Asylum by Harald Müller, Germany
Peer and the strange passenger by Mats Åberg, Sweden
The Onion - layer by layer by Ferdinand Wyller, Norway
The Button Moulder by Kamila Szejnoch, Poland
The thin Priest with a fowling net by Eamonn O'Doherty, Ireland
The meeting between Solvejg, Peer and the Button Moulder by Jan Kolasinski, Poland

References

External links
Peer Gynt Sculpture Park, official website
Peer Gynt Sculpture Park, official Facebook
Selvaag, official website

Sculpture gardens, trails and parks in Oslo
Parks in Oslo
Works based on Peer Gynt
Art museums established in 2006
2006 establishments in Norway